The National Heritage Monument is a group of copper statues representing anti-apartheid activists, Zulu chiefs and missionaries in Groenkloof Nature Reserve, South Africa. The monument is meant to reflect the struggle for liberation going back into the 1600s. The project was started in 2010, but as of 2015, only has 55 statues. A total of 400 to 500 statues are planned. When complete, the monument will be called "The Long March to Freedom".

History 
The idea for the project came from Dali Tambo in 2010, who is also the CEO of the National Heritage Project Company. The first of the statues were unveiled in September of 2015 by Nathi Mthethwa, the South African Minister of Arts and Culture.

Figures represented 

Autshumato
Chief Tshwane
Chief Klaas Stuurman
Louis van Mauritius
Dr Johannes van der Kemp
Makhanda
King Shaka kaSenzangakhona
Chief David Stuurman
Hintsa kaKhawuta
King Dingane
King Faku
King Mzilikazi
King Moshoeshoe
Kgosi Kgamanyane Pilane
Chief Adam Kok III
Chief Sandile kaNgqika
King Sekhukhune I
Bishop John Colenso
King Cetshwayo kaMpande
King Langalibalele
King Makhado Ramabulana
Chief Dalasile
King Nyabela
Chief Bhambatha kaMancinza
King Dinuzulu kaCetshwayo
Saul Msane
Olive Schreiner
Hadji Ojer Ally
Queen Labotsibeni Mdluli
Alfred Mangena
Harriette Colenso
Solomon Plaatje
Walter Rubusana
Chief Kgalusi Leboho
Charlotte Maxeke
Dr Abdullah Abdurahman
Thomas Mapikela
Josiah Gumede
John Dube
Anton Lembede
Mohandas Gandhi
Selope Thema
Sefako Makgatho
Clements Kadalie
Pixley Seme
Ida Mntwana
Alfred Xuma
Cissie Gool
Chief Albert Luthuli
Zachariah Matthews
Rev Zaccheus Mahabane
Bram Fischer
Jack Hodgson
Steve Biko
Duma Nokwe
Solomon Mahlangu
Josie Mpama
Lilian Ngoyi
Bertha Mkhize
Griffiths Mxenge
Ruth First
Yusuf Dadoo
Annie Silinga
Victoria Mxenge
Samora Machel
Olof Palme
Alan Paton
Helen Joseph
Rahima Moosa
Chris Hani
Joe Slovo
Frances Baard
Dorothy Nyembe
Archbishop Trevor Huddleston
Julius Nyerere
Govan Mbeki
Steve Tshwete
Beyers Naude
Ray Alexander
Miriam Makeba
Helen Suzman
Bertha Gxowa
Basil D'Oliveira
Ruth Mompati
Fidel Castro
Albertina Sisulu
Walter Sisulu
Adelaide Tambo
Oliver Tambo
Nelson Mandela

References

External links 

 Launch of National Heritage Monument (2015 speech)
 The National Heritage Monument Launched (video)

Sculpture
Monuments and memorials in South Africa